The Experiment to Detect the Global EoR Signature (EDGES) is an experiment and radio telescope located in a radio quiet zone at the Murchison Radio-astronomy Observatory in Western Australia. It is a collaboration between Arizona State University and Haystack Observatory, with infrastructure provided by CSIRO. EoR stands for epoch of reionization, a time in cosmic history when neutral atomic hydrogen gas became ionised due to ultraviolet light from the first stars.

Low-band instruments 
The experiment has two low-band instruments, each of which has a dipole antenna pointed to the zenith and observing a single polarisation. It is coupled with a radio receiver, with a 100m cable run to a digital spectrometer. Observations started in August 2015.

78 MHz absorption profile 
In March 2018 the collaboration published a paper in Nature announcing the discovery of a broad absorption profile centered at a frequency of MHz in the sky-averaged signal after subtracting Galactic synchrotron emission. The absorption profile has a width of MHz and an amplitude of K, against a background RMS of 0.025K, giving it a signal-to-noise ratio of 37. The signal is possibly due to ultraviolet light from the first stars in the Universe altering the emission of the 21cm line by lowering the temperature of the hydrogen relative to the cosmic microwave background (the mechanism is Wouthuysen–Field coupling). A "more exotic scenario," encouraged by the unexpected strength of the absorption, is that the signal is due to interactions between dark matter and baryons.

In 2022 an experiment called Shaped Antenna Measurement of the Background Radio Spectrum (SARAS) led by the Raman Research Institute reported that their measurements didn't replicate EDGES results rejecting them at 95.3% confidence level.

High-band instruments 

See also 
 Large Aperture Experiment to Detect the Dark Ages (LEDA)
 Absolute Radiometer for Cosmology, Astrophysics, and Diffuse Emission (ARCADE)
 List of astronomical observatories
 List of astronomical societies
 List of radio telescopes

References

External links 
 Signal from age of the first stars could shake up search for dark matter - www.sciencemag.org
 

Physical cosmology
Radio telescopes
Astronomical observatories in Western Australia